The Three Stricts, Three Honests is an internal education campaign led by the Chinese Communist Party (CCP) advanced by General Secretary of the CCP, Xi Jinping, in 2014, aimed at improving the ethical conduct of party officials and "improving political ecology". The campaign was essentially a response against perceived moral laxity in the Communist rank and file which has, over the years, according to the party itself, distanced government officials from ordinary people they were supposed to serve. 

The campaign was also aimed at tackling the endemic careerism, collusion between business and political elites, rent-seeking by officials, and superficiality that became pervasive in Chinese politics.  It took place in the backdrop of the wider anti-corruption campaign, creating a culture where officials "don't want to be corrupt, don't dare to be corrupt, and don't have the means to be corrupt." Since 2015, a party-wide "education campaign" began under the leadership of Xi and the senior official in charge of party affairs, Liu Yunshan, to instill these ideas in officials of all levels.

Xi initially raised the concept on March 19, 2014, at a panel discussion at the National People's Congress.

The "three honests" are:
Be honest in making decisions (also can be translated as "be honest in doing things")
Be honest in forging a career (also translated as "be honest in business")
Be honest in personal behavior

The "three stricts" are:
Be strict in moral conduct (also can be translated as "be strict in self-cultivation")
Be strict in exercising power
Be strict in disciplining oneself

See also 

 Ideology of the Chinese Communist Party

References

2015 in China
Ideology of the Chinese Communist Party
zh:三严三实